Stranger Than Fiction is the second album by drummer Keith LeBlanc, released in 1989 by Nettwerk in Canada, Enigma Records in the U.S., and Yellow Ltd. in Europe.  LeBlanc has also made it available for download on his Bandcamp page.

Track listing 
All songs written by Keith LeBlanc unless indicated.

12 was not included on the original Nettwerk CD release.

Personnel 

Musicians
Gary Clail – vocals (4, 8)
Andy Fairley – vocals (3, 4, 8)
Keith LeBlanc – drums, percussion, producer, mixing
Skip McDonald – guitar (2, 3, 5, 6, 9), keyboards (5, 6, 9), bass guitar (6)
Bonjo Iyabinghi Noah – percussion (5, 10)
Doug Wimbish – bass guitar (4, 6, 9)

Additional personnel
Black Box – vocals (4)
Wendell Brooks – saxophone (6)
Lenny Bruce – spoken word (12)
Adrian Sherwood – mixing
Kishi Yamamoto – vocals (9)

Release history

References

External links 
 

1989 albums
Keith LeBlanc albums
Albums produced by Keith LeBlanc